In 2022, the United States was the world’s third-largest producer of raw steel (after China and India), and the sixth-largest producer of pig iron. The industry produced 29 million metric tons of pig iron and 88 million tons of steel. Most iron and steel in the United States is now made from iron and steel scrap, rather than iron ore. The United States is also a major importer of iron and steel, as well as iron and steel products.

Employment as of 2014 was 149,000 people employed in iron and steel mills, and 69,000 in foundries. The value of iron and steel produced in 2014 was $113 billion. About 0.3% of the US population is employed by the steel industry.

As of 2022, major steel-makers in the United States included: Cleveland-Cliffs, Carpenter Technology, Commercial Metals Company, Nucor, Steel Dynamics, and U.S. Steel.

Types of steel mills
There are two main types of steel mills. The traditional large integrated steel mill, which reduces metallic iron from ore (iron oxide) and makes it into pig iron and steel, has been steadily declining in importance for decades in the US. The second type, the mini-mill, or specialty steel mill, which produces new steel products by melting steel scrap, now produces the majority of steel in the US.

Integrated steel mills
In 2017, there were 9 operating integrated steel mills in the United States (plus one idled), down from 13 in 2000. Integrated mills produced 31% of the steel produced in the US.

In an integrated steel mill, iron ore is reduced to metallic iron. In the US, this is done in blast furnaces and since 2014 again using direct reduced iron furnaces in Nucor's plant in Louisiana as well as another DRI plant (producing a compactified version of DRI called hot briquetted iron, or HBI) in Texas by Voestalpine. Some of the iron from the blast furnaces is converted to steel; today this is done in basic oxygen furnaces. Iron ore, coke, and flux are fed into the blast furnace and heated. The coke reduces the iron oxide in the ore to metallic iron, and the molten mass separates into slag and iron. Some of the iron from the blast furnace is cooled, and marketed as pig iron; the rest flows into basic oxygen furnaces, where it is converted into steel. Iron and steel scrap may be added to both the blast furnace and the basic iron furnace.

US Steel operates a number of integrated steel mills, including the Gary Works in Gary, Indiana. They also operate the Edgar Thomson Works, which is the iron- and steel-making unit of the Mon Valley Works, which includes three other related plants. The Company operates the Great Lakes Works, and Granite City Works.

Cleveland-Cliffs operates every integrated steel mill: in East Chicago, Indiana, Burns Harbor, Indiana, and Cleveland, Ohio.

In 2020, Cleveland Cliffs acquired AK Steel Corporation along with its three integrated steel mills, one in Middletown, Ohio, Dearborn, Michigan and the other in Ashland, Kentucky.  The Ashland Works is no longer active and has been demolished.

Current integrated steel mills in the US

Specialty steel mills / minimills
There were about 112 minimills or specialty mills in the US, which in 2013 produced 59% of US total steel production. The specialty mills use iron and steel scrap, rather than iron ore, as feedstock, and melt the scrap in electric furnaces.

Notable Specialty and Mini-Mills in the US

Raw materials
The two main inputs into iron- and steel-making are a source of iron and a source of energy. Additional requirements are a fluxing material to remove the impurities, and alloy metals to give particular properties to the metal.

Raw materials used in US iron and steel production, 2012

Iron ore

Iron and steel scrap
Two-thirds of the iron and steel produced in the US is made from recycled scrap, rather than from iron ore. In 2014, 81 million mt of iron and steel were produced from scrap. Most steel from scrap is produced using electric arc furnaces.

Coke
Coke, produced from coking coal, is used to reduce iron ore (made up of iron oxides) to metallic iron.

Flux 
Flux is added to the furnace charge (iron ore, pig iron, or scrap) to lower the melting point, and draw unwanted impurities into the slag. The most common flux is lime. Other fluxes include dolomite, soda ash, and fluorspar.

Alloy metals
Other metals are commonly added to steel to produce alloy steels of various types. Common alloy metals are manganese, nickel, molybdenum, chromium, and vanadium. Stainless steel commonly contains a minimum of 10.5% chromium, and may also contain significant amounts of nickel or molybdenum.

Slag

Slag, a byproduct of iron and steel-making composed primarily of highly  impure glass, would normally be a waste product. However, it is in demand as an aggregate in concrete, asphalt paving, and construction fill. In 2014, the industry produced and marketed about 16.0 million mt of slag, worth an estimated $270 million.

International trade 
The United States has been a major importer of steel and steel mill products since the 1960s. In 2014, the US exported 11 million tons of steel products, and imported 39 million tons. Net imports were 17 percent of consumption.

History of US iron- and steel-making 

The US iron and steel industry has paralleled the industry in other  countries in technological developments. In the 1800s, the US switched from charcoal to coke in ore smelting, adopted the Bessemer process, and saw the rise of very large integrated steel mills. In the 20th century, the US industry successively adopted the open hearth process, then the basic oxygen furnace. Since the American industry peaked in the 1940s and 1950s, the US industry has shifted to small mini-mills and specialty mills, using iron and steel scrap as feedstock, rather than iron ore.

References

External links
 American Iron and Steel Institute

Steel industry of the United States